Francisco Aguirre (born 1908, date of death unknown) was a Paraguayan footballer that played as a midfielder. Aguirre was part of the Paraguay national football team that participated in the 1930 FIFA World Cup. During most of his career he played for Olimpia Asunción.

References

1908 births
1930 FIFA World Cup players
Paraguayan footballers
Club Olimpia footballers
Paraguay international footballers
Year of death missing
Association football midfielders